Shakes may refer to:
Milkshakes
Health shakes
 Delirium tremens or "the shakes", a symptom of alcohol withdrawal
 Shakes (timber), cracks in timber
 Shakes (Tlingit leaders), a Tlingit generational leadership title
 Shakes the Clown, a 1991 film by and starring Bobcat Goldthwait
 The Shakes (album), by Herbert, 2015
 "Shakes", a song by Emeli Sandé from Long Live the Angels, 2016
 "The Shakes", a song by Priestess from Hello Master, 2005
 Shakes, a fictional character in the comic Supa Strikas

People
 Shakes Kubuitsile (born 1962), Botswana boxer
 Paul Shakes (born 1952), Canadian ice hockey player
 Ricky Shakes (born 1985), English football player
 Ephraim Mashaba (born 1950), nicknamed Shakes, South African football manager and former player
 Siviwe Soyizwapi (born 1992), nicknamed Shakes, South African rugby union player

See also
 Shake (disambiguation)
 Shaked, a secular Israeli settlement in the West Bank
 Shaken (disambiguation)
 Shaker (disambiguation)
 Shook (disambiguation)